Dalton Hall is a grade II* listed Georgian country house in Dalton Holme, East Riding of Yorkshire, England.

It is constructed of grey brick with stone dressing and a slate roof. The main block is built in three storeys with a five-bay frontage and single storey flanking wings linking to one and two-storey pavilions.

History
The Hotham family acquired the former manor house that stood east of the present Hall in the late 17th century. John Hotham had been created 1st Baronet Hotham of Scorborough in 1622 and was High Sheriff of Yorkshire for 1634. The present hall was built between 1771 and 1775 by Thomas Atkinson of York for Sir Charles Hotham-Thompson, 8th Baronet. In 1797 Sir William Hotham, 11th Baronet was elevated to the Irish Peerage as 1st Baron Hotham. Beaumont Hotham, 3rd Baron Hotham was a general in the British Army who fought at Salamanca, Vitoria and Waterloo. He was MP for Leominster from 1820 to 1841 and for the East Riding of Yorkshire from 1841 to 1868.

The building was then remodelled in 1872–77 by Payne & Talbot of Birmingham for the 5th Baron Hotham, involving the addition of balustrades and the replacement of Atkinson’s east entrance porch with a colonnade.

In 1954–45 further extensive remodelling of the hall took place during the tenure of the 8th Baron. The house is still occupied by the Hotham family.

References

Country houses in the East Riding of Yorkshire
Grade II* listed buildings in the East Riding of Yorkshire